K. R. N. Rajeshkumar is an Indian politician. He was elected to the Rajya Sabha, upper house of the Parliament of India from Tamil Nadu as a member of the Dravida Munnetra Kazhagam.

References

Dravida Munnetra Kazhagam politicians
Rajya Sabha members from Tamil Nadu
Living people
Year of birth missing (living people)